Novak Djokovic defeated the two-time defending champion Roger Federer in the final, 7–6(8–6), 7–5 to win the singles tennis title at the 2012 ATP World Tour Finals. It was his second Tour Finals title.

Janko Tipsarević made his debut as a direct qualifier, after playing two matches as an alternate in 2011.

Seeds

Alternates

Draw

Finals

Group A
Standings are determined by: 1. number of wins; 2. number of matches; 3. in two-players-ties, head-to-head records; 4. in three-players-ties, percentage of sets won, or of games won initially to sort out a superior/inferior player, then head-to-head records; 5. ATP rankings.

Group B
Standings are determined by: 1. number of wins; 2. number of matches; 3. in two-players-ties, head-to-head records; 4. in three-players-ties, percentage of sets won, or of games won initially to sort out a superior/inferior player, then head-to-head records; 5. ATP rankings.

References

External Links
Main Draw

Singles

fr:ATP World Tour Finals 2012#Simple